Gabriel Desjardins (born 14 February 1949 in Montreal, Quebec) was a Progressive Conservative member of the House of Commons of Canada. He was a businessman, professor and trader by career.

He represented the Quebec riding of Témiscamingue where he was first elected in the 1984 federal election and re-elected in 1988, therefore becoming a member in the 33rd and 34th Canadian Parliaments.

Desjardins left federal politics when he was defeated in the 1993 federal election by Pierre Brien of the Bloc Québécois.

Electoral record

External links
 

1949 births
Living people
Businesspeople from Montreal
Members of the House of Commons of Canada from Quebec
Politicians from Montreal
Progressive Conservative Party of Canada MPs